The Demarest Public Schools is a community public school district that serves students in kindergarten through eighth grade from Demarest in Bergen County, New Jersey, United States.

As of the 2018–19 school year, the district, comprising three schools, had an enrollment of 695 students and 70.3 classroom teachers (on an FTE basis), for a student–teacher ratio of 9.9:1.

The district is classified by the New Jersey Department of Education as being in District Factor Group "I", the second-highest of eight groupings. District Factor Groups organize districts statewide to allow comparison by common socioeconomic characteristics of the local districts. From lowest socioeconomic status to highest, the categories are A, B, CD, DE, FG, GH, I and J.

Students in ninth through twelfth grades attend Northern Valley Regional High School at Demarest in Demarest, together with students from Closter and Haworth. The high school is part of the Northern Valley Regional High School District, which also serves students from Harrington Park, Northvale, Norwood and Old Tappan at Northern Valley Regional High School at Old Tappan. During the 1994-96 school years, Northern Valley Regional High School at Demarest was awarded the Blue Ribbon School Award of Excellence by the United States Department of Education. As of the 2018–19 school year, the high school had an enrollment of 1,038 students and 97.4 classroom teachers (on an FTE basis), for a student–teacher ratio of 10.7:1.

The district participates in special education programs offered by Region III, one of seven such regional programs in Bergen County. Region III coordinates and develops special education programs for the 1,000 students with learning disabilities in the region, which also includes the Alpine, Closter, Harrington Park, Haworth, Northvale, Norwood and  Old Tappan districts, as well as the Northern Valley Regional High School District.

Schools
Schools in the district (with 2018–19 enrollment data from the National Center for Education Statistics) are:
Elementary schools
County Road School with 163 students in pre-kindergarten through first grade 
Luther Lee Emerson School with 214 students in grades 2 - 4
Middle school
Demarest Middle School with 309 students in grades 5 through 8

The district has an active PTO to provide enrichment for students and afternoon school-age care from school closing to 6 PM; no before-school care is available.

Administration
Core members of the district's administration are:
Michael Fox, Superintendent of Schools
Thomas Perez, Business Administrator / Board Secretary

Board of education
The district's board of education, with nine members, sets policy and oversees the fiscal and educational operation of the district through its administration. As a Type II school district, the board's trustees are elected directly by voters to serve three-year terms of office on a staggered basis, with three seats up for election each year held (since 2012) as part of the November general election. The board appoints a superintendent to oversee the day-to-day operation of the district.

References

External links
Demarest Public Schools

Data for Demarest Public Schools, National Center for Education Statistics
Northern Valley Regional High School at Demarest

Demarest, New Jersey
New Jersey District Factor Group I
School districts in Bergen County, New Jersey